Thrippara Shiva Kshetram is a famous Shiva temple in Vallicode village, Pathanamthitta District, Kerala, India. This temple is located on the banks of the Achankovil river. The main sanctum sanctorum here is situated in the open directly above the temple ghats. This makes it a bit different from other temples in this area. The temple has a history dating back to 800 years.

See also
 Temples of Kerala
 Pathanamthitta District
 Thazhoor Bhagavathy Kshetram

Shiva temples in Kerala
Hindu temples in Pathanamthitta district